Tengnueng Sitjaesairoong (born October 6, 1992), formerly known as Super-X Por. Petchnamchai, is a Thai Muay Thai fighter from the Nakhon Sawan Province of Central Thailand. He is a 2014 King's Cup Super 8 Tournament winner.

Tengnueng is known for his tendency of knocking out opponents early in his fights, usually within the first round.

He has achieved fame on Thai Fight. Fighting in a larger weight class than most Thai fighters, Tengnueng has become a fan favorite in the promotion and is a main event staple. He is a 2015 Thai Fight 70kg Tournament Champion.

As of November 2021, Tengnueng is ranked the No. 6 light heavyweight by WBC Muaythai.

Early years
Tengnueng Sitjaesairoong was born Ekkapan Somboonsab on October 6, 1992, in Nakhon Sawan, Thailand.

He started practicing Muay Thai at the age of 6, receiving training from his father, a former Muay Thai fighter. In his early days, he would partake in 3-round fights.

Muay Thai career
Tengnueng first joined the Meenayothin Gym but later moved to the Rachanon Gym to kickstart his Muay Thai career. He began fighting under the ring name of Super-X Por. Petchnamchai.

Early on, his professional career got off to a rough start as he lost the majority of his fights, all by decision. During this time, he usually fought at the Siam Omnoi Stadium and the prestigious Rajadamnern Stadium.

On September 19, 2012, Tengnueng made his first appearance on Thai Fight, facing Abdallah Mabel at THAI FIGHT Extreme 2012: France. However, he wound up losing by 2nd-round TKO.

After a falling out with the head of the Rachanon Gym, he took some time away from Muay Thai. Tengnueng later returned and resumed training with the Dejrat Muay Thai Academy in 2014, with whom he has been training ever since, and began fighting under his current ring name of Tengnueng Sitjaesairoong.

His style of Muay Thai is regarded as 'Muay Mat', emphasizing powerful punches, particularly his left hand.

2014
In his comeback, Tengnueng Sitjaesairoong went on to participate in the 2014 Omnoi Stadium Weber 154 lbs Muay Thai Tournament at Omnoi Stadium.

On November 8, 2014, Tengnueng defeated Kompetchlek Lookprabat to become the 2014 Omnoi Stadium Weber 154 lbs Tournament Champion.

On December 5, 2014, Tengnueng participated in the one-night King's Cup challenger tournament. In the tournament semis, he knocked out Sweden's Carl N'Diaye in the 1st round. In the finals, he defeated Ilya Grad of Israel by 1st-round KO to win the 2014 King's Cup.

2015
He made his return to THAI FIGHT on April 4, 2015, where he faced Rungrawee Kemmuaythaigym at THAI FIGHT CRMA, where he won by three-round decision.

He then defeated Gaëtan Dambo by decision at THAI FIGHT Samui 2015 on May 2, 2015.

Next, he faced Alex Oller at THAI FIGHT Proud to Be Thai: China in China on July 18, 2015, where he proceeded to deliver a 1st-round knockout, the first of many.

On August 22, 2015, he defeated Alka Matewa of Belgium by unanimous decision at THAI FIGHT Narathiwat.

Tengnueng resumed his habit of finishing opponents and began a long streak of knockout victories as he proceeded to beat Aleksei Dodonov via 2nd-round TKO at THAI FIGHT Proud to Be Thai: Moscow on September 17, 2015.

On October 24, 2015, Tengnueng defeated the Lithuanian Sigitas Gaizauskas by 2nd-round KO at THAI FIGHT Proud to Be Thai: Vietnam.

On November 21, 2015, he claimed a 1st-round KO victory over Florian Breau at THAI FIGHT RPCA.

In the final THAI FIGHT event of 2015, THAI FIGHT Count Down, Tengnueng faced the Brazilian José Neto for the 2015 THAI FIGHT 70 kg Championship on December 31, 2015. After connecting on multiple punching combinations, Tengnueng was able to score a 1st-round KO victory. As a result, he was crowned the 2015 THAI FIGHT 70 kg King's Cup Champion.

2016
Tengnueng started 2016 with a 2nd-round TKO victory over Daniel Kerr of Germany at THAI FIGHT Korat 2016 on March 19, 2016.

On April 30, 2016, he secured a 1st-round KO victory over Brazil's Reinato Gomes at THAI FIGHT Samui 2016.

On July 23, 2016, Tengnueng would brutally dispatch Sok Tauch of Cambodia with a 1st-round TKO victory at THAI FIGHT Proud To Be Thai 2016.

On August 20, 2016, Tengnueng was able to secure 2 KO wins in one night at THAI FIGHT KMITL. He first knocked out Yan Naing Aung of Myanmar in the 1st round. He then proceeded to deliver another 1st-round KO over Sinan Uluturk of Turkey that same evening.

At THAI FIGHT London, on September 11, 2016, he beat Sam Gough by 1st-round TKO with a low kick.

On October 5, 2016, Tengnueng defeated Erik Massion of Germany by 1st-round KO at THAI FIGHT Emei.

He would then go on an uncharacteristic three-fight losing streak, including a decision loss to Hamza Ngoto at THAI FIGHT Paris on April 8, 2017. This marked his first loss in THAI FIGHT since September 19, 2012.

2019
After a period of inactivity for most of 2017 and 2018, in which he fought once each year, Tengnueng later returned to THAI FIGHT in 2019 on February 23, 2019, at THAI FIGHT Phuket 2019. This time, he had noticeably put on weight and fought at a heavier 80 kg (176 lbs), as opposed to his previous fighting weights of 70–75 kg (154-165 lbs). His first opponent of the year was Russia's Mike Vetrila, whom he knocked out in the 1st round, keeping his streak of KO wins alive at 12.

On March 30, 2019, he defeated Evgenii Afanasev at THAI FIGHT Mueang Khon 2019 by 2nd-round KO.

Tengnueng seemed to return to his previous form, despite his weight gain, when he delivered a 1st-round KO of Simon Maait of Australia at THAI FIGHT Samui 2019 on April 27, 2019.

However, this was not to last as his performance was called into question when he faced Mohammad Hossein Doroudian of Iran at THAI FIGHT Betong 2019 on June 29, 2019. After uncharacteristically getting knocked down early in the 1st round, Tengnueng seemed hesitant to engage but was able to inflict his own damage in much of the 2nd round. However, the judges deemed the fight to be even after 3 rounds and declared the match a draw, requiring a 4th round to be fought. Both Tengnueng and Doroudian, obviously gassed, were reluctant to engage but the Thai was declared the winner by extra-round decision. This fight ultimately ended Tengnueng's streak of wins by KO at 14.

On August 24, 2019, Tengnueng defeated Aboofazel Goodarzi by 1st-round KO at THAI FIGHT Kham Chanod 2019.

Tengnueng was eventually booked for a rematch with Mohammad Hossein Doroudian at THAI FIGHT Bangsaen 2019 on October 26, 2019. This time around, Tengnueng captured the 1st-round KO victory with a series of high kicks that gradually wore down Doroudian's arms.

On November 23, 2019, Tengnueng faced Shahram Delavar at THAI FIGHT Mae Sot 2019. While he dominated the entire 3 rounds of the fight, Tengnueng was unable to finish off Delavar and ended up getting the win by decision.

On December 21, 2019, at THAI FIGHT: Thai Fest in Patong, Tengnueng faced perhaps one of his most decorated and experienced opponents in the USA's Cyrus Washington, who experienced success competing in Lethwei in Myanmar. While Washington was older and slower, he was able to avoid getting knocked out by Tengnueng and the fight eventually went the full 3 rounds. Nevertheless, Tengnueng took the decision victory and was awarded a THAI FIGHT Kard Chuek Superfight 81 kg belt.

2020-2021
Tengnueng entered his first THAI FIGHT King's Cup Tournament since 2015, this time contesting for the inaugural THAI FIGHT 72.5 kg Kard Chuek King's Cup Championship. He will face Nicolas Rooney in the tournament semi-finals at THAI FIGHT Strong on July 4, 2021. He defeated Rooney by second-round knockout. Tengnueng is scheduled to rematch Nicolas Mendes in the 72.5 kg Tournament Final, whom he previously fought at THAI FIGHT New Normal the year before.

Due to travel restrictions pertaining to the COVID-19 pandemic, Mendes was later replaced by Thomas Carpenter in the Tournament Final. Tengnueng won the fight by first-round knockout via liver shot to win his second Thai Fight King's Cup title.

Titles
THAI FIGHT 
2020 THAI FIGHT 72.5 kg Kard Chuek King's Cup Champion
2019 THAI FIGHT Kard Chuek 81 kg Superfight Champion
2015 THAI FIGHT 70 kg King's Cup Champion 
2015 Isuzu Cup Superfight 70 kg Champion 
30–2 record
World Muaythai Council (WMC) 
2014 WMC King's Cup Challenger Tournament Champion
Omnoi Stadium 
2014 Omnoi Stadium Weber 70 kg Tournament Champion
La Nuit des Titans
2012 La Nuit des Titans 72 kg Tournament Champion
International Federation of Muaythai Associations
 2016 IFMA World Championships 75 kg

Muay Thai record

|- style="background:#cfc;"
| 2023-02-04 || Win || align="left" | Corey beldon || THAI FIGHT Luang Phor Ruay|| Saraburi province, Thailand ||  TKO (Referee stoppage)|| 1 || 
|- style="background:#CCFFCC;"
| 2022-12-24|| Win || align="left" | Emerson Bento|| Thai Fight: Metropolitan Police Bureau 100th Anniversary || Bangkok, Thailand || KO (Punches)|| 1 || 
|- style="background:#CCFFCC;"
| 2022-11-20|| Win || align="left" | Elad Suman|| THAI FIGHT Vana Nava Hua Hin || Hua Hin district, Thailand || Decision || 3 || 3:00 
|- style="background:#cfc;"
| 2022-10-16|| Win || align="left" | Luis Paulo Terra || THAI FIGHT || Bangkok, Thailand || KO || 1 || 
|- style="background:#cfc;"
| 2022-06-26|| Win || align="left" | Tun Min Latt|| THAI FIGHT Sisaket|| Sisaket province, Thailand || KO || 1 || 
|- style="background:#cfc;"
| 2022-05-29|| Win|| align="left" | Mohammad Karimishargh|| THAI FIGHT Nakhon Sawan || Nakhon Sawan province, Thailand || KO (Punches) || 1 ||
|- style="background:#CCFFCC;"
| 2022-05-08|| Win || align="left" | Daniel Kerr|| THAI FIGHT Sung Noen || Sung Noen district, Thailand || KO || 1 || 
|-  style="background:#CCFFCC;"
| 2022-04-17|| Win ||align=left| Thomas Carpenter || THAI FIGHT KonlakPathum || , Thailand || TKO || 2 ||
|-  style="background:#CCFFCC;"
| 2021-12-19|| Win ||align=left| Thomas Carpenter || THAI FIGHT Khao Aor || Phatthalung, Thailand || KO || 1 ||
|-
! style=background:white colspan=9 |
|-  style="background:#CCFFCC;"
| 2021-07-04|| Win ||align=left| Nicolas Rooney || THAI FIGHT Strong || Pattaya, Thailand || KO || 2 ||
|-  style="background:#CCFFCC;"
| 2021-04-25|| Win ||align=left| Will Chope || THAI FIGHT DMHTT || Samut Sakhon, Thailand || KO || 1 ||
|-  style="background:#CCFFCC;"
| 2021-04-03|| Win ||align=left| Nikolay Gussev || THAI FIGHT Nan || Nan, Thailand || KO || 1 ||
|-  style="background:#CCFFCC;"
| 2020-11-28|| Win ||align=left| Thiago Teixeira || THAI FIGHT Pluak Daeng || Rayong, Thailand || KO || 1 ||
|-  style="background:#CCFFCC;"
| 2020-11-07|| Win ||align=left| Daniel Kerr || THAI FIGHT Korat 2020 || Nakhon Ratchasima, Thailand || TKO || 1 ||
|-  style="background:#CCFFCC;"
| 2020-10-17|| Win ||align=left| Mikhail Vetrila || THAI FIGHT Begins || Nonthaburi, Thailand || KO || 2 ||
|-  style="background:#CCFFCC;"
| 2020-09-19|| Win ||align=left| Nicolas Mendes || THAI FIGHT New Normal || Bangkok, Thailand || KO || 1 ||
|-  style="background:#CCFFCC;"
| 2019-12-21|| Win ||align=left| Cyrus Washington || THAI FIGHT: Thai Fest in Patong || Phuket, Thailand || Decision || 3 || 3:00
|-
! style=background:white colspan=9 |
|-  style="background:#CCFFCC;"
| 2019-11-23|| Win ||align=left| Shahram Delavar || THAI FIGHT Mae Sot || Mae Sot, Thailand || Decision || 3 || 3:00
|-  style="background:#CCFFCC;"
| 2019-10-26 || Win ||align=left| Mohammad Hossein Doroudian || THAI FIGHT Bangsaen || Chonburi, Thailand || KO || 1 ||
|-  style="background:#CCFFCC;"
| 2019-08-24|| Win ||align=left| Aboofazel Goodarzi || THAI FIGHT Kham Chanod 2019 || Udon Thani, Thailand || KO || 1 ||
|-  style="background:#CCFFCC;"
| 2019-07-23|| Win||align=left|  Mohammad Hossein Doroudian || THAI FIGHT Betong 2019 || Betong, Thailand || Ext. Rd. Decision || 4 || 3:00
|-  style="background:#CCFFCC;"
| 2019-04-27 || Win ||align=left| Simon Maait || THAI FIGHT Samui 2019 || Samui, Thailand || KO || 1 ||
|-  style="background:#CCFFCC;"
| 2019-03-30|| Win ||align=left| Evgenii Afanasev || THAI FIGHT Mueang Khon 2019 || Nakhon Si Thammarat, Thailand || KO || 2 ||
|-  style="background:#CCFFCC;"
| 2019-02-23|| Win ||align=left| Mikhail Vetrila || THAI FIGHT Phuket 2019 || Phuket, Thailand || KO || 1 ||
|-  style="background:#fbb;"
| 2018-06-01|| Loss ||align=left| Law Chosing || Kunlun Fight Macao || Macau, China || Decision || 3 || 3:00
|-  style="background:#fbb;"
| 2017-04-08|| Loss ||align=left| Hamza Ngoto || THAI FIGHT Paris || Paris, France || Decision || 3 || 3:00
|-  style="background:#fbb;"
| 2016-10-29|| Loss ||align=left| Jimmy Vienot || Best of Siam IX || Paris, France || Decision || 5 || 3:00
|-  style="background:#CCFFCC;"
| 2016-10-05|| Win ||align=left| Erik Massion || THAI FIGHT Chengdu || Leshan, China || KO || 1 ||
|-  style="background:#CCFFCC;"
| 2016-09-11|| Win ||align=left| Sam Gough || THAI FIGHT London || London, England || KO || 1 ||
|-  style="background:#CCFFCC;"
| 2016-08-20|| Win ||align=left| Sinan Uluturk || THAI FIGHT KMITL || Bangkok, Thailand || KO || 1 ||
|-  style="background:#CCFFCC;"
| 2016-08-20|| Win ||align=left| Yan Naing Aung || THAI FIGHT KMITL || Bangkok, Thailand || KO || 1 ||
|-  style="background:#CCFFCC;"
| 2016-07-23|| Win ||align=left| Sok Tauch || THAI FIGHT Proud To Be Thai 2016 || Nonthaburi, Thailand || TKO || 1 ||
|-  style="background:#CCFFCC;"
| 2016-04-30|| Win ||align=left| Reinato Gomes || THAI FIGHT Samui 2016 || Samui, Thailand || KO || 1 ||
|-  style="background:#CCFFCC;"
| 2016-03-19|| Win ||align=left| Daniel Kerr || THAI FIGHT Korat 2016 || Korat, Thailand || TKO || 2 ||
|-  style="background:#CCFFCC;"
| 2015-12-31|| Win ||align=left| José Neto || THAI FIGHT Count Down || Bangkok, Thailand || KO || 1 || 
|-
! style=background:white colspan=9 |
|-  style="background:#CCFFCC;"
| 2015-11-21|| Win ||align=left| Florian Breau ||  THAI FIGHT RPCA || Nakhon Pathom, Thailand || KO || 1 ||
|-  style="background:#CCFFCC;"
| 2015-10-24|| Win ||align=left| Sigitas Gaizauskas || THAI FIGHT Proud to Be Thai 2015: Vietnam || Vietnam || KO|| 2 ||
|-  style="background:#CCFFCC;"
| 2015-09-17|| Win ||align=left| Aleksei Dodonov || THAI FIGHT Proud to Be Thai 2015: Moscow || Moscow, Russia || TKO || 2 ||
|-  style="background:#CCFFCC;"
| 2015-08-22 || Win ||align=left| Alka Matewa || THAI FIGHT Proud to Be Thai 2015: Narathiwat || Narathiwat, Thailand || Decision || 3 || 3:00
|-  style="background:#CCFFCC;"
| 2015-07-18 || Win ||align=left| Alex Oller || THAI FIGHT Proud to Be Thai 2015: China || Zhengzhou, China || KO || 1 ||
|-  style="background:#CCFFCC;"
| 2015-05-02 || Win ||align=left| Gaëtan Dambo || THAI FIGHT Samui 2015 || Samui, Thailand || Decision || 3 || 3:00
|-  style="background:#CCFFCC;"
| 2015-04-04 || Win ||align=left| Rungrawee P.K. Saenchai Muaythaigym || THAI FIGHT CRMA || Nakhon Nayok, Thailand || Decision || 3 || 3:00
|-  style="background:#fbb;"
| 2015-01-24|| Loss ||align=left| Yodpayak Kaoklaigym  || Omnoi Stadium || Bangkok, Thailand || Decision || 5 || 3:00
|-  style="background:#CCFFCC;"
| 2014-12-05|| Win ||align=left| Ilya Grad  || 2014 King's Cup || Bangkok, Thailand || KO || 4 || 
|-
! style=background:white colspan=9|
|-  style="background:#CCFFCC;"
| 2014-12-05|| Win ||align=left| Carl N'Diaye || 2014 King's Cup || Bangkok, Thailand || KO || 1 ||
|-  style="background:#CCFFCC;"
| 2014-11-08|| Win ||align=left| Kompetchlek Lookprabat  || Omnoi Stadium || Bangkok, Thailand || KO || 4 || 
|-
! style=background:white colspan=9|
|-  style="background:#CCFFCC;"
| 2014-11-02|| Win ||align=left| Superchamp Namduempinthipkorat  || Omnoi Stadium || Bangkok, Thailand || KO || 2 ||
|-  style="background:#CCFFCC;"
| 2014-09-09 || Win ||align=left| Thepsutin Pumpanmuang || Omnoi Stadium || Bangkok, Thailand || KO || 2 ||
|-  style="background:#CCFFCC;"
| 2014-05-31 || Win ||align=left| Chalarmkao Rodbansomkiattrang || Omnoi Stadium || Bangkok, Thailand || KO || 2 ||
|-  style="background:#c5d2ea;"
| 2013-06-15 || Draw ||align=left| Azize Hlali || Time Fight 3 || Tours, France || Draw || 3 ||
|-  style="background:#CCFFCC;"
| 2013-05-04 || Win||align=left| Lahoucine Idouche || La Nuit des Revanches || Bagnolet, France || Decision || 5 || 3:00
|-  style="background:#CCFFCC;"
| 2013-02-02 || Win ||align=left| Azize Hlali || La Nuit des Titans || Tours, France || TKO || 2 ||
|-  style="background:#CCFFCC;"
| 2012-12-02 || Win ||align=left| Patrick Djanang || Gala International Thai-Boxing || Reims, France || TKO (Referee stoppage) || 5 ||
|-  style="background:#fbb;"
| 2012-09-19 || Loss ||align=left| Abdallah Mabel || THAI FIGHT Extreme 2012: France || Lyon, France || TKO || 2 ||
|-  style="background:#CCFFCC;"
| 2012-04-28 || Win ||align=left| Raphaël Llodra || Gala international de Boxe Thai & K1 Rules || Bagnolet, France || Decision || 3 || 3:00
|-  style="background:#CCFFCC;"
| 2012-04-28 || Win ||align=left| Sofian Seboussi || Gala international de Boxe Thai & K1 Rules || Bangkok, Thailand || TKO (Injury) || 1 ||
|-  style="background:#CCFFCC;"
| 2012-03-17 || Win||align=left| Mickaël Piscitello || La Nuit des Titans || Tours, France || KO || 1 ||
|- 
! style=background:white colspan=9 |
|-  style="background:#CCFFCC;"
| 2012-03-17 || Win ||align=left| Farès Bechar || La Nuit des Titans || Tours, France || Decision || 3 || 3:00
|-  style="background:#fbb;"
| 2011-08-06|| Loss ||align=left| Saksongkram Poptheeratham || Omnoi Stadium || Bangkok, Thailand || Decision || 5 || 3:00
|-
| colspan=9 | Legend:    

|- style="background:#fbb;"
| 2016-05-29 || Loss ||align=left| Vitaly Gurkov || 2016 I.F.M.A. World Muaythai World Championships, Final || Jonkoping, Sweden || ||  
|-
! style=background:white colspan=9|
|- style="background:#cfc;"
| 2016-05-27|| Win||align=left|  || 2016 I.F.M.A. World Muaythai World Championships, Semi FInals || Jonkoping, Sweden ||  ||  ||
|- style="background:#cfc;"
| 2016-05-25|| Win||align=left| Troy Jones || 2016 I.F.M.A. World Muaythai World Championships, Quarter FInals || Jonkoping, Sweden ||  ||  ||
|- style="background:#cfc;"
| 2016-05-21|| Win ||align=left|   || I.F.M.A. World Muaythai 2016 Championships || Jonkoping, Sweden ||  ||  ||
|-
| colspan=9 | Legend:

References

External links
 Tengnueng Sitjaesairoong at THAI FIGHT

1992 births
Living people
Middleweight kickboxers
Light heavyweight kickboxers
Cruiserweight kickboxers
Tengnueng Sitjaesairoong
Tengnueng Sitjaesairoong